William Ernest Duncombe, 1st Earl of Feversham (28 January 1829 – 13 January 1915), known as The Lord Feversham between 1867 and 1868, was a British Conservative politician.

Biography
Duncombe was the son of William Duncombe, 2nd Baron Feversham, and his wife Lady Louisa Stewart. He was elected to the House of Commons for East Retford in 1852, a seat he held until 1857, and then represented the North Riding of Yorkshire between 1859 and 1867. The latter year he succeeded his father in the barony and entered the House of Lords. In 1868 he was created Viscount Helmsley, of Helmsley in the North Riding of the County of York, and Earl of Feversham, of Ryedale in the North Riding of the County of York.

Marriage and children
Lord Feversham married Mabel Violet, daughter of Sir James Graham, 2nd Baronet, in 1851. They had seven children:

 Lady Mabel Cynthia Duncombe (born ?, died 25 April 1926)
 Lady Ulrica Duncombe (born 1875, died 27 April 1935), married Brigadier-General the Hon. Everard Baring, CBE, CVO, son of Edward Baring, 1st Baron Revelstoke
 Lady Helen Venetia Duncombe (born 1866, died 16 May 1954), married Edgar Vincent, 1st Viscount D'Abernon, no issue.
 William Reginald Duncombe, Viscount Helmsley (born 1 August 1852, died 24 December 1881), father of Charles Duncombe, 2nd Earl of Feversham
 Hon. James Henry Duncombe (born 20 October 1853, died 10 January 1886), unmarried.
 Hon. Hubert Ernest Valentine Duncombe, DSO (born 14 February 1862, died 21 October 1918), MP for Egremont 1895–1900, unmarried. 
 Lady Hermione Wilhelmina Duncombe (born 30 March 1864, died 19 March 1895), married Gerald FitzGerald, 5th Duke of Leinster, mother of the 6th and 7th Dukes of Leinster.

Lord Feversham died in January 1915, aged 85, and was succeeded in his titles by his grandson Charles, his eldest son and heir apparent William having predeceased him. Lady Feversham died only seven months after her husband.

Notes

References
Kidd, Charles, Williamson, David (editors). Debrett's Peerage and Baronetage (1990 edition). New York: St Martin's Press, 1990,

External links 

1829 births
1915 deaths
Earls in the Peerage of the United Kingdom
Younger sons of barons
Conservative Party (UK) MPs for English constituencies
UK MPs 1852–1857
UK MPs 1859–1865
UK MPs 1865–1868
Feversham, E1
UK MPs who were granted peerages
William
Peers of the United Kingdom created by Queen Victoria